Sondre Auklend (born 10 June 2003) is a Norwegian professional footballer who plays as a midfielder for Viking FK.

Career
On 15 May 2020, Auklend signed a three-year contract with Viking. On 9 August 2021, he was loaned out to Norwegian First Division side Åsane. He missed most of the 2022 season due to injury.

Career statistics

References

External links

2003 births
Living people
Norwegian footballers
Norway youth international footballers
Association football midfielders
Eliteserien players
Norwegian First Division players
Viking FK players
Åsane Fotball players